Venkatapuram is a village in the Addanki Mandal of the Prakasam district in the Indian state of Andhra Pradesh.

Geography 
Venkatapuram has an average elevation of 24 meters (82 ft). It is located between the three major towns of Guntur, Ongole and Addanki.

References 

Villages in Prakasam district